Braidon Burns (born 8 July 1996) is an Australian professional rugby league footballer who plays as a  and er for the Canterbury-Bankstown Bulldogs in the NRL. He is the nephew of Canterbury premiership winner, Rod Silva.

Background
Burns was born in Dubbo, New South Wales, Australia, and is of Indigenous Australian descent.

He played his junior rugby league for the Coonamble Bears. He was then signed by the Penrith Panthers.

Playing career

Early career
In 2015 and 2016, Burns played for the Penrith Panthers' NYC team. In August 2016, he signed a two-year contract with the South Sydney Rabbitohs starting in 2017.

2017
In round 2 of the 2017 NRL season, Burns made his NRL debut for South Sydney against the Manly-Warringah Sea Eagles.  In round 6 against Penrith, Burns endured a horror night after dropping multiple bombs from Nathan Cleary.  Souths went on to win the match 21-20.  Burns played the following week but then was left out of the side for eight weeks until managing to be recalled to the starting lineup for Souths round 15 clash against the Gold Coast.

2018
Burns made his first appearance of the season for Souths in the round 4 Good Friday match against Canterbury.  Burns made a total of five appearances for Souths in 2018 but spent the majority of the season playing in reserve grade for North Sydney and did not feature in Souths finals campaign.

2019
Burns played a total of nine games for South Sydney in the 2019 NRL season as the club finished third on the table at the end of the regular season.  Burns did not play in South Sydney's finals campaign.

2020
In round 8 of the 2020 NRL season, Burns was taken from the field during South Sydney's victory over Canterbury-Bankstown.  It was later revealed that Burns had suffered a dislocated knee and would be ruled out for the season.

2021
In round 9 of the 2021 NRL season, Burns made his return to the South Sydney side where they were defeated 50-0 by Melbourne.

In round 22, Burns scored two tries for South Sydney in a 36-6 victory over the Gold Coast.
On 5 October, Burns signed a two-year contract to join Canterbury starting in 2022.

2022
In round 1 of the 2022 NRL season, Burns made his club debut for Canterbury in their 6-4 victory against North Queensland at the Queensland Country Bank Stadium.
In round 6, Burns was taken from the field during Canterbury's loss to South Sydney and was later ruled out for a month with a hamstring injury.
Burns played a total of 14 matches for Canterbury throughout the year scoring four tries. Canterbury would finish the season in 12th place and miss the finals.

References

External links
South Sydney Rabbitohs profile
Rabbitohs profile
NRL profile

1996 births
Living people
Australian rugby league players
Indigenous Australian rugby league players
North Sydney Bears NSW Cup players
Rugby league centres
Rugby league players from Dubbo
South Sydney Rabbitohs players
Canterbury-Bankstown Bulldogs players